Karyan (also Romanized as Kāryān, Kāreyān, Kārīān, and Kārīyān) is a village in Harm Rural District, Juyom District, Larestan County, Fars Province, Iran. At the 2006 census, its population was 2,068, in 404 families.

Karyan is the setting of a Zoroastrian legend during the time of the Muslim conquest of Persia, where a Muslim force of 12,000 men besieged Karyun only to be slain single-handedly and unopposed by a Persian defender named Shah Karan while they were engaged in their prayer. However, a new Muslim army, seeking revenge, was able to conquer Karyan after the betrayal of Shah Karan's wife and the residents were then massacred.

References 

Populated places in Larestan County